Robert Riu Andrews (born November 30, 1971), popularly known as Bobby Andrews, is a Filipino actor, TV host and former matinee idol. Starting out as a commercial model, he rose to fame when he teamed up with Angelu de Leon in the famous teen-oriented television show T.G.I.S. and its sequel Growing Up.

Acting career

In 2009, Bobby appeared in the Philippine remake series of Zorro aired on GMA Network. He was part of the installment of Sine Novela called Kaya Kong Abutin ang Langit with Iza Calzado, Wendell Ramos and Angelika dela Cruz.

In 2010, he went back to ABS-CBN to become part of the Precious Hearts Romances Presents of Martha Cecila's Impostor. He was also seen in the hit primetime remake of Emil Cruz Jr.'s Mara Clara.

Television success
In the 1990s, Andrews gained fame with the hit GMA-7 and Viva television show T.G.I.S., a teen-and-youth-oriented show which pioneered teen television dramas in the Philippines. In 1997, he did the hit soap Ikaw Na Sana and ended with a movie with his co-star and then-screen partner Angelu de Leon. 

In 1998, he became part of GMA soaps such as Ganyan Kita Kamahal and Halik Sa Apoy. In 2002, he was part of the melodramatic soap Sana ay Ikaw na Nga. In 2004, he came to ABS-CBN to star in the now-defunct hit memorable first fantasy television drama Marina. 

In 2005, he became part of GMA-7's first fantasy series Encantadia The First Season and 2006's Agawin Mo Man ang Lahat. In 2007, he came back to primetime as Ronald Santilian in the primetime series Walang Kapalit and 2008's, Lobo as a supporting role. In 2009, he was part of the Sine Novela afternoon soap Kaya Kong Abutin ang Langit. In 2010, he was in the afternoon hit soap Martha Cecila's Impostor which topped the afternoon line up and was mostly seen daily on the primetime remake of Emil Cruz Jr.'s Mara Clara as Amanthe Del Valle.

Political career
Andrews entered into politics when he filed his candidacy for councilor in Quezon City's 4th district for the May 2022 polls under Lakas–CMD. He was included in the Malayang Quezon City coalition of Anakalusugan partylist representative Mike Defensor. 

However, he failed to win a seat in the city council when he got the 8th place in the official count.

Filmography

Television

Personal life
Andrews is married to a Chinese woman named Bienne Co. They have two children.

References

External links

Filipino male film actors
Living people
1976 births
GMA Network personalities
ABS-CBN personalities
TV5 (Philippine TV network) personalities
Viva Artists Agency
American male actors of Filipino descent
Filipino people of American descent
Filipino male comedians
Lakas–CMD politicians
Filipino male television actors